General Arenales is a town in Buenos Aires Province, Argentina. It is the administrative centre for General Arenales Partido.

External links

Populated places in Buenos Aires Province